Giorgos Kyrtsos is a Greek politician who has been serving as a Member of the European Parliament since 2014.

Member of the European Parliament, 2014–present
In parliament, Kyrtsos has been serving on the Committee on Economic and Monetary Affairs since 2014. In 2019, he also joined the Committee on Foreign Affairs.

In addition to his committee assignments, Kyrtsos has been part of the Parliament's delegations for relations with the NATO Parliamentary Assembly (2014–2019) and with the Arab Peninsula (since 2019).

Kyrtsos was expelled from New Democracy on 18 February 2022 following his criticism of the government of Prime Minister Kyriakos Mitsotakis for curtailing press freedom. On 4 May 2022, he left the EPP and joined Renew Europe.

Political positions
In 2019, Kyrtsos publicly endorsed policy proposals put forward by Greek Solution founder Kyriakos Velopoulos according which illegal immigrants to Greece are to be sent to remote, uninhabited islands to await deportation.

In November 2021, Kyrtsos joined a group of seven Members of the European Parliament led by Raphaël Glucksmann to Taiwan to send a strong signal in support of the self-ruling island, despite a threat of retaliation from China.

In 2022, Kyrtsos and his colleague Markus Ferber tabled several amendments to paragraphs relating to the European Central Bank's climate strategy in a report by the Parliament, criticizing ECB President Christine Lagarde's plan to take greater account of the environment in core policy decisions as a "distraction" from the bank's duty to tame inflation.

References

Living people
MEPs for Greece 2019–2024
New Democracy (Greece) politicians
1952 births
Politicians from Athens
New Democracy (Greece) MEPs
MEPs for Greece 2014–2019